Liberty Hill is a city in Williamson County, Texas, United States. The population was 3,646 at the 2020 census. Liberty Hill is part of the  metropolitan area.

Geography

Liberty Hill is located at  (30.664219, –97.911261), about 29 miles northwest of Austin.

According to the United States Census Bureau, the city has a total area of 1.9 square miles (5.0 km2), of which, 1.9 square miles (4.9 km2) of it is land and 0.52% is water

Demographics

As of the 2020 United States census, there were 3,646 people, 1,244 households, and 843 families residing in the city.

At the 2010 census there were 967 people in 337 households, including 224 families, in the city. The population density was 738.7 people per square mile (284.8/km2). There were 387 housing units. The racial makeup of the city was 76.1% White, 1.6% African American, 1.7% Native American, 0.8% Asian, 9.5% from other races, and 3.5% from two or more races. Hispanic or Latino of any race were 19.3%.

Of the 459 households 38.0% had children under the age of 18 living with them, 49.0% were married couples living together, and 33.5% were non-families. 27.9% of households were one person and 12.7% were one person aged 65 or older. The average household size was 2.55 and the average family size was 3.19.

The age distribution was 34.9% under the age of 18, and 12.3% 65 or older. The median age was 34.2 years.

The median household income was $56,955 and the median family income  was $73,125. Males had a median income of $43,098 versus $40,481 for females. The per capita income for the city was $20,112. About 9.1% of families and 14.1% of the population were below the poverty line, including 25.9% of those under age 18.

History 

The first settlers arrived in the 1840s. A post office was opened three miles west of the present townsite in 1853 and its first postmaster suggested for the place the name Liberty Hill. Subsequently, the town moved eastward twice. In 1871, a building of hand-cut limestone was erected by S.P. Stubblefield at the corner of Main and Myrtle. He operated the property as a general store until 1881. This structure, today known as the Stubblefield Visitors Center, is perhaps the oldest still standing in Liberty Hill.

Arts and culture

Media
Liberty Hill has one newspaper, The Liberty Hill Independent.

Sculpture
In 1976, Liberty Hill hosted an International Sculpture Symposium, which created the Liberty Hill International Sculpture Park. The park hosts 27 monumental pieces made from granite, concrete, bronze, and limestone.

Education
The City of Liberty Hill is served by the Liberty Hill Independent School District.

Academic competitions
In the 2004–2005 academic year, the Liberty Hill High School spelling team won first place at the UIL State Competition in division 3A.

Athletics
The Liberty Hill High School football team won the Texas Football State Championship in 3A Division II against Celina in 2006 and in 3A Division I against Gilmer in 2007.
The Liberty Hill High School Girls track team sent the 4x400 team to state in 2016 and placed second and in 2017 and placed first.

Notable people
 Trey Hillman, bench coach for the Houston Astros and former manager for the Kansas City Royals
 John Reynolds Hughes, famous Texas Ranger, probable person on whom "The Lone Ranger", by Zane Grey, was based
 Pearl A. Neas, longtime registrar at Southwestern University
 Dustin Rhodes, professional wrestler currently signed to All Elite Wrestling

Climate
The climate in this area is characterized by hot, humid summers and generally mild to cool winters.  According to the Köppen Climate Classification system, Liberty Hill has a humid subtropical climate, abbreviated "Cfa" on climate maps.

References

External links

 City of Liberty Hill official website
 

Cities in Texas
Cities in Williamson County, Texas
Greater Austin